The  is an electric multiple unit (EMU) train type operated by the private railway operator Meitetsu in Japan since January 2005.

Formation
The sets are formed as follows.

 Cars 1, 4, and 6 each have a single-arm pantograph.
 Car 4 is designated as a mildly air-conditioned car.

Interior 
Car 2 is equipped with a men's toilet and a universal-access toilet. The 2300 series cars adopt a commuter-oriented seating configuration based on that of the 3300 series, consisting of longitudinal bench seating as well as transverse seating bays.

Gallery

History

The original fleet of nine 6-car trainsets was built from 2004, and consist of two limited express configuration cars based on the 2000 series EMUs together with four commuter configuration cars with three pairs of doors per side. The trains entered service from 29 January 2005.

Two more six-car sets were built in fiscal 2015.

Another six-car set, numbered 2212, was delivered in 2016.

Set 2213 was delivered in February 2019.

2230 subseries 
Following the withdrawal of the 1700 series, four additional six-car sets were formed from 2019. Numbered 2231 to 2234, these sets are formed of two newly built limited express cars and four 2300 series commuter-style cars that were originally part of 1700 series trainsets. The first 2230 subseries set to be formed, 2234, entered service in February 2020, using the 2300 series cars from 1700 series set 1704.

References

External links

 Meitetsu 2200 series information 

Electric multiple units of Japan
2200 series
Train-related introductions in 2005
1500 V DC multiple units of Japan
Nippon Sharyo multiple units